NGC 4056 is an elliptical galaxy located about 340 million light-years away in the constellation Coma Berenices. The galaxy was discovered by astronomer Albert Marth on March 18, 1865 and is a member of the NGC 4065 Group.

Although NGC 4056 is commonly equated with PGC 38140, there is still uncertainty in its identification.

See also 
 List of NGC objects (4001–5000)

References

External links

4056
038140
Coma Berenices
Astronomical objects discovered in 1865
Elliptical galaxies
NGC 4065 Group